The 2022 Desert Diamond Casino West Valley 100 was the 11th and final stock car race of the 2022 ARCA Menards Series West season, and the 50th iteration of the event. The race was held on Friday, November 4, 2022, in Avondale, Arizona at Phoenix Raceway, a 1 mile (1.6 km) permanent tr-oval shaped racetrack. The race was increased from 100 laps to 107 laps, due to an overtime finish. Sammy Smith, driving for Kyle Busch Motorsports, would overcome a penalty, and earn his first career ARCA Menards Series West win. He would also dominate the majority of the race, leading 75 laps. To fill out the podium, Jesse Love, driving for Venturini Motorsports, and Andrés Peréz de Lara, driving for David Gilliland Racing, would finish second and third, respectively. 

By virtue of starting the race, Jake Drew, driving for Sunrise Ford Racing, would claim the 2022 ARCA Menards Series West championship. This was Drew's first championship in the series, along with the first championship for Sunrise Ford Racing since 2018. It would also end up being Sunrise Ford Racing's final championship, as the team announced that they would shut down at the end of 2022.

Background 
Phoenix Raceway is a 1-mile, low-banked tri-oval race track located in Avondale, Arizona, near Phoenix. The motorsport track opened in 1964 and currently hosts two NASCAR race weekends annually including the final championship race since 2020. Phoenix Raceway has also hosted the CART, IndyCar Series, USAC and the WeatherTech SportsCar Championship. The raceway is currently owned and operated by NASCAR.

Phoenix Raceway is home to two annual NASCAR race weekends, one of 13 facilities on the NASCAR schedule to host more than one race weekend a year. It first joined the NASCAR Cup Series schedule in 1988 as a late season event, and in 2005 the track was given a spring date. The now-NASCAR Camping World Truck Series was added in 1995 and the now-NASCAR Xfinity Series began running there in 1999.

NASCAR announced that its championship weekend events would be run at Phoenix for 2020, marking the first time since NASCAR inaugurated the weekend that Homestead-Miami Speedway would not be the host track. The track will also hold the championship for the 2021 NASCAR Cup season.

Entry list 

 (R) denotes rookie driver

Practice/Qualifying 
Practice and qualifying will both be combined into one 75-minute session, with a driver's fastest time counting as their qualifying lap. It was held on Thursday, November 3, at 6:30 PM MST.

Race results

References

External links 

2022 ARCA Menards Series West
Desert Diamond Casino West Valley 100
Desert Diamond Casino West Valley 100